Papillion-La Vista Senior High School, often referred to as Papio, PLHS, North or "Old School", is located in Papillion, Nebraska, United States and is operated by the Papillion-La Vista Public School District. Its school colors are maroon and gold, and the Mascot is monarchs.

History 
The Papillion-La Vista Public Schools District originated well over a century ago. It is reported to be the first school district to be established in Nebraska Territory, in 1872.

Papillion-La Vista High School dates back to September 1876. Originally housed in a single brick building at the corner of Halleck & Adams Streets, Papillion's only school served students in all 12 grades. In 1893 the school moved to a new brick building at 420 S. Washington Street, the present site of the district offices. The city continued to grow, and in February 1957, Papillion High School opened in a new building across Washington Street (presently Papillion Junior High) to students in grades 7-12.

The city of La Vista incorporated in 1960 and presented no education system.  The students of this new development area north of Papillion had been incorporated into the Papillion School District. Papillion's steady growth continued. By September 1969, voters in the district had passed a bond issue to build a new high school facility at 84th Street and East Centennial Road. A similar bond issue the preceding year had been defeated. The high school moved north to its present location in August 1971, serving students in grades 9 through 12. In 1987, La Vista was officially added to the district and the high school's name was officially changed to Papillion-La Vista High School.

The 1999 film Election was shot mainly in Papillion-La Vista High School.    Papillion-La Vista High School had actual classes going on during much of the filming of Election.  The background noises during much of the film are actual teachers and their students in nearby rooms.

Second high school 
Continued population growth resulted in the construction of Papillion-La Vista South High School (PLSHS), in southwest Papillion, which opened in August 2003.  PLHS had previously been a 10-12 school, and 9th graders had attended classes at the two junior high schools in the district.  After the school district opened a second high school, the freshman class was moved from the junior high schools to the two high schools.

Sports 
 Football - Class A Champions 1990 and 1996;Runner-up 1986, Runner-up 1987, Runner-up 1995 and Runner-up 1997
 Softball - 13 Class A Championships, 2 Runners-up from 1995-2010 (including 10 straight)
 Volleyball - Class A Champions - 2000, 2001, 2002, 2007, and 2008
 Girls' track and field - Class A State Champions - 1997, 1998, 1999
 Boys' golf - Class A Champion - 1999
 Boys' tennis - Class A Champion - 1978
 Boys' basketball - Class A Champion - 1993, Runner-up 2013, 1971
 Boys' swimming - Class A Champion - 2003
 Boys' soccer - Class A Champion - 1991
 Wrestling - Class A Champion - 2001
 Boys' All-Nebraska All-Sport Award -2012
 Cross country
 Baseball - 1997, 1998
 Girls' tennis - 2015

Notable alumni
Jordy Bahl, college softball player for the Oklahoma Sooners
Kenzo Cotton, All American and Southeastern Conference Champion sprinter at the University of Arkansas.
 Reggie Baul, former Nebraska Cornhuskers football player (played on 1995 team)
 Merle Dandridge, Broadway actress and the voice of Alyx Vance in the award-winning action game Half-Life 2 and its sequels, Episode One and Episode Two
 Allan Evridge, former Kansas State and Wisconsin quarterback
 Peaches James, All-American softball University of Nebraska, three time first-team All-State Nebraska High School softball 
 Matty Lewis, Musician and lead singer of the band Zebrahead
 Gina Mancuso, Gatorade Volleyball player of the year
 Carlos Martínez, professional football player, formerly with the Dallas Cowboys
 Skate, rapper and musician; real name Nathan Maloley
 Jeremy Slechta, former professional football player with the Philadelphia Eagles and Houston Texans
 Becca Swanson, nicknamed "the strongest woman in the world" for lifting more weight than any other woman in the world; squatting over 800 lbs, benchpressing over 500 lbs, and total lifting (squatting, benchpressing and deadlifting) more than 2000 lbs
 Allison Weston, 2000 Olympic Volleyball Captain and University of Nebraska Volleyball, All-State Nebraska High School volleyball, basketball, and soccer

References

External links
 School website
 District website
 Papillion-LaVista High School - class reunions

Public high schools in Nebraska
Educational institutions established in 1971
1971 establishments in Nebraska
Schools in Sarpy County, Nebraska